The Diocese of Canelones is a Latin Church ecclesiastical territory or diocese of the Catholic church in Uruguay. The diocese was erected in 1961, and is a suffragan diocese in the ecclesiastical province of the metropolitan Archdiocese of Montevideo. Its episcopal see is the Cathedral of Canelones.

The current and fourth bishop of Canelones is Bishop Heriberto Andrés Bodeant Fernández, who was appointed by Pope Francis, on 19 March 2021. Bishop Fernández is assisted by the auxiliary bishop of Canelones, Auxiliary Bishop Leopoldo Hermes Garin Bruzzone, Titular Bishop of Benepota. The bishops emeritus are Orlando Romero Cabrera and Alberto Francisco María Sanguinetti Montero; the first bishop, Bishop Emeritus Nuti, died on November 2, 1999, having served from 1962 to 1994.

Bishops

Ordinaries
Orestes Santiago Nuti Sanguinetti, S.D.B. † (2 Jan 1962 – 25 Oct 1994 Retired) 
Orlando Romero Cabrera (25 Oct 1994 – 23 Feb 2010 Retired)
Alberto Francisco María Sanguinetti Montero (23 Feb 2010 – 19 Mar 2021 Retired)
Heriberto Andrés Bodeant Fernández (19 Mar 2021 – present)

Auxiliary bishop
Leopoldo Hermes Garin Bruzzone (2002-)

See also
List of churches in the Diocese of Canelones
List of Roman Catholic dioceses in Uruguay

References

External links
 
 Official website 
 

Religion in Canelones Department
Canelones
Canelones
Christian organizations established in 1961
1961 establishments in Uruguay
Roman Catholic dioceses and prelatures established in the 20th century